Reasons for Voyaging is the debut album  by New Zealand-based rock band Atlas, released on 19 November 2007. The album was recorded with David Nicholas (Pulp, Ash, Elton John and INXS) and produced by Hank Linderman (The Beach Boys, Eagles) at Neil Finn's Roundhead Studios in Auckland.

Track listing
"Disillusioned" – 5:16
"Is This Real" – 3:46
"Crawl" – 3:56
"Early Warning" – 5:31
"Magic 8"  – 4:03
"Mr Sorrow" – 4:16
"Fragile" – 4:32
"Downfall" – 3:38
"Saving Grace" – 4:36
"Doctor"/"Firefly" – 9:39
"Shut" - 4:08 (iTunes bonus track)
"Art Of Conversation" - 3:54 (iTunes bonus track)

Credits
Sean Cunningham – Vocals and Guitar
Beth Campbell – Vocals 
Ben Campbell – Bass, Keys and BV's
Andy Lynch - Lead Guitar, Percussion and BV's
Joe McCallum - Drums and Percussion
Don Bartle - Mastering
Neil Baldoc, David Nicholas - Engineer
Dave Paul - Assistant Engineer
David Nicholas - Mixer
Andrew Edgson - Mix Assistant
Josh Telford - Mix Assistant

Notes
The album is named after a sculpture by New Zealand sculptor Graham Bennett. The sculpture is said to, "Convey a sense of arrival and departure, invitation and challenge, and encourages us to consider to experiences and motivations of all visitors to New Zealand, including Maori and Polynesian voyager, European settlers and recent migrants."

References

Atlas (band) albums
2007 debut albums
Albums recorded at Roundhead Studios